Margitta Scherr (born 15 August 1943) is a German film and television actress.

Selected filmography
 Father, Mother and Nine Children (1958)
 Hunting Party (1959)
 Of Course, the Motorists (1959)
 The Sweet Life of Count Bobby (1962)
 Holiday in St. Tropez (1964)
 The Merry Wives of Tyrol (1964)
 Our Man in Jamaica (1965)
 Come to the Blue Adriatic (1966)
 The Sinful Village (1966)
 Salto Mortale (1969–1972, TV series)

References

Bibliography
 Claudio Honsal. Peter Alexander "Das Leben ist lebenswert": die Biographie. Amalthea, 2006.

External links
 

1943 births
Living people
German film actresses
German television actresses
People from Chemnitz